Abdur Rouf is a Bangladesh Awami League politician and the former Member of Parliament of Nilphamari-1.

Career
Rouf was elected to parliament from Nilphamari-1 as a Bangladesh Awami League candidate in 1991. He served as the whip of parliament. He is a former President of Bangladesh Chhatra League.

Death
Rouf died on 29 November 2011.

References

Awami League politicians
2011 deaths
5th Jatiya Sangsad members